Simone Henry (born 3 May 1938) is a French sprinter. She competed in the women's 200 metres at the 1956 Summer Olympics.

References

External links
 

1938 births
Living people
Athletes (track and field) at the 1956 Summer Olympics
French female sprinters
Olympic athletes of France
Place of birth missing (living people)
Olympic female sprinters
20th-century French women